Cariomothis  is a butterfly genus in the family Riodinidae. They are resident in the Neotropics.

Species list 
 Cariomothis chia (Hübner, 1823) Suriname
 Cariomothis erotylus Stichel, 1910 Bolivia , Peru.
 Cariomothis erythromelas (Sepp, [1848]) Suriname, Ecuador , Brazil.
 Cariomothis poeciloptera (Godman & Salvin, 1878) Costa Rica,  Panama , Colombia

Sources
 Cariomothis

Riodininae
Butterfly genera
Taxa named by Hans Ferdinand Emil Julius Stichel